The Fidget is a satirical play published by Ludvig Holberg in 1723. It premiered at Lille Grønnegade Theatre in Copenhagen on 25 November 1726.

Plot summary
Vielgeschrey, a fidget merchant constantly surrounded by hubhub, is prone to believing that he is much more busy than he really is. This eventually makes him suffer a tragicomic fate.

Roles
 
 Vielgeschrei 
 Pernille 
 Oldfux 
 Magdelone 
 Leander 
 Leonora 
 Leonard 
 Erik Madsen 
 Peder Eriksen 
 Ane 
 A barber 
 Corfitz 
 Christen Griffel 
 En bonde

Adaptions

Denmark
DT has produced a Danish television version of Den Stundesløse that was first broadcast on 19 April 1973. It was directed by John Price and starred Jørgen Reenberg (Vielgescrey), Ghita Nørby (Pernille) and Henning Moritzen (Oldfux).

Norway
NEK has produced Norwegian-language  "made-for-television" of Den stundesløse that was first broadcast on 24 January 1964. It was directed by Per Simonnæs and Ulf Stenbjørn and starred  Rolf Berntzen (Vielgeschrei ), Randi Lindtner Næss (Pernille) and Lothar Lindtner (Oldfux ). NRK released a new television version of the play on  7 February 1978. It was directed by Magne Bleness and starred Arne Aas, Bentein Baardson, Thom Bastholm-

English translations

References

External links

 Portraits of actors

Plays by Ludvig Holberg
1723 plays